Independence Township is one of eighteen townships in Appanoose County, Iowa, United States. As of the 2010 census, its population was 248.

History
Independence Township was founded in 1848.

In 1857 William Chadwick, Appanoose County justice of peace, plotted the village of Milledgeville along the east bank of the Chariton River.

North Bend Church and the Chariton River Church are in Independence Township.

Geography
According to the USGS, it contains six cemeteries: Brushy, Charitan River, Cozad, Johnson, Milledgeville and Wadlington.

References

External links
 US-Counties.com
 City-Data.com

Townships in Appanoose County, Iowa
Townships in Iowa
1848 establishments in Iowa
Populated places established in 1848